Raveau is a commune in the Nièvre department in central France.

It is located near La Charité-sur-Loire.

Demographics
On 1 January 2019, the estimated population was 654.

See also
Communes of the Nièvre department

References

Communes of Nièvre